Samuel Rennie (18 July 1903 – 28 February 1952) was a Canadian boxer. He competed in the men's flyweight event at the 1924 Summer Olympics.

References

External links
 

1903 births
1952 deaths
Canadian male boxers
Olympic boxers of Canada
Boxers at the 1924 Summer Olympics
Boxers from Montreal
Anglophone Quebec people
Flyweight boxers